The MCA Years: A Retrospective was released on MCA Records in 1993, and contains songs from Nanci Griffith's five MCA albums:  Lone Star State of Mind (1987), Little Love Affairs (1988), One Fair Summer Evening (1988), Storms (1989), and Late Night Grande Hotel (1991).

Track listing

References

Nanci Griffith compilation albums
1993 compilation albums
MCA Records compilation albums